Franz-Peter Hofmeister (born 5 August 1951) was a West German athlete who competed mainly in the 400 metres.

He competed for West Germany in the 1976 Summer Olympics held in Montreal, Quebec, Canada in the 4 x 400 metre relay where he won the bronze medal with his teammates Lothar Krieg, Harald Schmid and Bernd Herrmann.

He was born in Kerpen, North Rhine-Westphalia.

References

 
 European Championships

1951 births
Living people
People from Kerpen
Sportspeople from Cologne (region)
West German male sprinters
Olympic bronze medalists for West Germany
Athletes (track and field) at the 1976 Summer Olympics
Olympic athletes of West Germany
European Athletics Championships medalists
Medalists at the 1976 Summer Olympics
Olympic bronze medalists in athletics (track and field)
Universiade medalists in athletics (track and field)
Universiade silver medalists for West Germany
Medalists at the 1979 Summer Universiade